Abanindranath Thakur Sarani (renamed from Camac Street) is a street running in the central business district of Kolkata, India, from Park Street (Allen Park) to Acharya Jagadish Chandra Bose Road (Nizam Palace). The road was named after William Camac, a senior merchant in the days of Lord Cornwallis and Lord Wellesley. In the mid-1970s, the Park Street 'razzmatazz' spilled onto Camac Street which is, today, considered to be a high street of Kolkata with many commercial establishments and high-end shopping destinations, with many shopping malls, boutiques, restaurants and stand-alone stores. It intersects Middleton Street and Shakespeare Sarani, two other important roads in the CBD. Several smaller roads like Middleton Row, Short Street, Victoria Terrace and Albert Road merge into Camac Street from the east or west.

Gallery

References

Streets in Kolkata
Tourist attractions in Kolkata
Shopping districts and streets in India